E-Trade Financial Corporation (stylized as E*TRADE), a subsidiary of Morgan Stanley, offers an electronic trading platform to trade financial assets. The company receives revenue from interest income on margin balances, commissions for order execution, payment for order flow, and management services.

History

In 1982, William A. Porter and Bernard A. Newcomb founded TradePlus in Palo Alto, California, with $15,000 in capital. In 1991, Porter and Newcomb founded E-Trade Securities, Inc., with several hundred thousand dollars of startup capital from TradePlus. E-Trade offered its trading services via America Online and Compuserve. In 1994, its revenues neared $11 million, up from $850,000 in 1992.

By June 30, 1996, the company had 73,000 accounts and processed 8,000 trades per day, with quarterly revenue of $15 million.

On August 16, 1996, the company became a public company via an initial public offering.

In 2000, the company acquired Telebanc.

In May 2001, the company acquired Web Street Securities for $45 million in stock.

In January 2004, Toronto-Dominion Bank held talks to merge its TD Waterhouse discount brokerage with E-Trade, but the two sides could not come to an agreement over control of the merged entity. TD Waterhouse instead merged with Ameritrade to form TD Ameritrade. After the merger, E-Trade continued talks to merge with TD Ameritrade but the two sides could not agree on price and governance rights.

In August 2005, the company acquired Harrisdirect (known under previous owners as DLJdirect and CSFBdirect) from Bank of Montreal. Two months later, E-Trade acquired Brown & Company (aka BrownCo) from JPMorgan Chase for $1.6 billion in cash.

In July 2007, E-Trade Australia, which was a separately operated company owned 6% by the company, was purchased by ANZ Bank for $432 million.

E-Trade suffered losses in the 2000s United States housing bubble. On November 29, 2007, E-Trade announced a transaction in which Citadel LLC invested $2.5 billion in cash in exchange for the company's securitized subprime mortgages, collateralized debt obligations (CDOs) and second lien loans, as well as 12.5% senior unsecured notes, and 84,687,686 shares of common stock (equal to 19.99% of the then currently outstanding shares). This resulted in a net $2.2 billion reduction in assets on the company's balance sheet. Citadel received a seat on the board of directors of the company and Mitch Caplan resigned as CEO.

In November 2007, the company revoked the brand name license from SBI E-Trade Securities in Japan.

In March 2008, E-Trade named Donald Layton, formerly JPMorgan Chase vice chairman, as its new CEO. Layton had joined E-Trade's board of directors in November 2007, at the same time as the Citadel LLC deal.

In December 2009, Robert Druskin, a former chief operating officer of Citigroup was named interim CEO and chairman.

On March 22, 2010, Steven Freiberg was named CEO. Freiberg was the former co-CEO of Citigroup's global consumer group and former head of its credit card unit.

On January 17, 2013, Paul T. Idzik was appointed CEO. Idzik had previously been group chief executive of DTZ and also served ten years at Barclays bank.

On September 12, 2016, E-Trade acquired OptionsHouse for $725 million and later that month Karl A. Roessner, E-Trade's general counsel since 2009, was appointed CEO.

On October 19, 2017, E*TRADE acquired RIA custodial services company Trust Company of America.

On August 14, 2019, Michael Pizzi was appointed CEO.

On December 9, 2019, E-Trade acquired student loan benefit provider Gradifi.

In October 2020, the company was acquired by Morgan Stanley.

See also

 Ajaxo Inc. v. E*Trade Financial Corp.
 Merrill Lynch, Pierce, Fenner & Smith Inc. v. Manning, a 2016 Supreme Court case involving naked short-selling claims against E*TRADE and Merrill Lynch, and others, resolved in defendants' favor.

References

External links
 

1982 establishments in California
1996 initial public offerings
2020 mergers and acquisitions
American companies established in 1982
Companies formerly listed on the Nasdaq
Financial services companies established in 1982
Online brokerages
American corporate subsidiaries
Online financial services companies of the United States
Morgan Stanley
Companies based in Arlington County, Virginia